Olga TV is a British independent television production company set up by the entertainer and talk show host, Paul O'Grady in 2005.

Named after O'Grady's pet dog, Olga the company is best known for producing shows such as The Paul O'Grady Show for Channel 4.  The Paul O'Grady Show ended on Channel 4 on 18 December 2009, as O'Grady had signed a new deal with ITV.

Between 2010 and 2011, Olga TV produced Friday night ITV chatshow Paul O'Grady Live, however on 7 October 2011, it was announced that the show had been cancelled.

Paul O'Grady's latest show For the Love of Dogs is not produced by Olga TV, but with Shiver instead.

On 4 May 2013 ITV confirmed that The Paul O'Grady Show would return in November 2013 with an initial 25 episode run and that it will be produced by O'Grady's production company Olga TV.

Productions

1 This was a joint production with Potato
2 These were joint productions with Shiver Productions

References

External links
The Paul O'Grady Show at Channel4.com

Television production companies of the United Kingdom
Paul O'Grady